Bruce Liu Sing-lee (born 8 October 1958 in Hong Kong) is a Hong Kong solicitor and politician. He is the former chairman of the moderate Association for Democracy and People's Livelihood and an elected member of Kowloon City District Council (2008–2011) representing the Kai Tak constituency.

He graduated from the Department of Social Work in the Chinese University of Hong Kong in 1983. He was a member of the Wong Tai Sin District Board (1985–1999), the Legislative Council of Hong Kong (1995–1997) and the Provisional Legislative Council (1997–1998).

References

1958 births
Living people
Leaders of political parties
District councillors of Kowloon City District
District councillors of Wong Tai Sin District
Solicitors of Hong Kong
Members of the Urban Council of Hong Kong
Alumni of the Chinese University of Hong Kong
Hong Kong Association for Democracy and People's Livelihood politicians
Members of the Provisional Legislative Council
HK LegCo Members 1995–1997
Members of the Election Committee of Hong Kong, 2012–2017
Members of the Election Committee of Hong Kong, 2017–2021